The Topic International Darts League was a darts tournament held at the Triavium in Nijmegen, Netherlands. Raymond van Barneveld dominated the tournament, held in his home country, winning it on three of the five occasions it was held. Gary Anderson was the final champion, having claimed the title in 2007, when the tournament also became the first major event to witness two nine dart finishes.

Held in May, it was the second leg of the BDO’s Grand Slam title of televised majors, along with the World Darts Trophy, the Winmau World Masters and the Lakeside World Professional Championship.

It began as a tournament for BDO players, but following van Barneveld's move to the PDC, Dutch broadcaster SBS-6 were able to grant five invitations to non-WDF affiliated players for the first time in 2006, in order to maintain interest in the event. The number of invitations was increased to 20 in 2007 as more Dutch players, including Jelle Klaasen and Michael van Gerwen, had moved to the PDC. This was done with the agreement of the Schoofs Management & Events/Maximum Score – the owner and promoter of the tournament.

It is the only major event that Phil Taylor has competed in at least once, but never won.

End of event
Towards the end of 2007, the chairman of the PDC, Barry Hearn, announced that its players would not be competing in the 2008 International Darts League and World Darts Trophy events. As a result, SBS6 announced they would no longer be broadcasting the event, with their coverage relying heavily on big names such as van Barneveld, which then cast doubts over whether either tournament would go ahead.

The tournament promoters filed a lawsuit against the PDC and SBS6 claiming a contract had been agreed for the PDC players to be involved. The case ended in failure on 21 February 2008, and the International Darts League was indefinitely postponed. The future of the World Darts Trophy was also thrown into doubt as a result of the decision, and both events were confirmed defunct by the failure of an appeal on April 29, 2008.

Format
The format has changed slightly over the years – the 2006 competition had 8 round-robin groups of 4 players. The top two players in each group qualified for another round-robin phase. Again, the top two players in each group progressed, but this time to the quarter-finals of the knockout stages.

Despite the presence of the PDC players in 2006 and 2007, the tournament was still a WDF/BDO ranking event, with all available points going only to the WDF/BDO players competing.

International Darts League finals

Sponsors
 2003–2005 Tempus
 2006–2007 Topic

References

External links
 International Darts League
 IDL 2006 – A Review

 
2003 establishments in the Netherlands
2007 disestablishments in the Netherlands
Professional Darts Corporation tournaments
British Darts Organisation tournaments
Darts in the Netherlands
International sports competitions hosted by the Netherlands